The Extraordinary Waiter (AKA: Diner and Waiter Comic) is a 1902 British short  silent comedy film, directed by Walter R. Booth, featuring a brutish colonialist failing to destroy a blackfaced waiter. The film, "makes for somewhat uncomfortable viewing," but according to Michael Brooke of BFI Screenonline, "it's just about possible to read this as a metaphor for the rather more widespread frustrations arising from British colonial rule (the Boer War was still a current issue), though it seems unlikely that this was intentional on Booth's part."

References

External links

1902 films
1902 short films
British black-and-white films
British silent short films
1902 comedy films
Blackface minstrel shows and films
British comedy short films
Films directed by Walter R. Booth
Silent comedy films